Interviú (a Spanish Anglicism for "interview") was a Spanish language weekly news magazine published in Madrid, Spain. It was in circulation between 1976 and 2018.

History and profile
Interviú was established in 1976 by a group led by Antonio Asensio Pizarro and  Josep Llario. It was first published on 22 May 1976. The publisher of the magazine was Grupo Zeta which was also founded by Asensio Pizarro in 1976. The magazine was published weekly on Mondays, and its headquarters was in Madrid.

The magazine was famous for publishing semi-nude and nude photographs of the rich and famous, sometimes using paparazzi photoshoots or posed pictorials (in this last case, normally women). It also published articles on political and economic scandals, and featured opinion pieces by famous writers.

Its last issue was on 8 January 2018. Grupo Zeta explained this was due to financial reasons and changes in the way the public consumes news.

Circulation
The circulation of Interviú was about 1 million copies both in 1977 and in 1978. It rose to three million copies in 1979. The magazine had a circulation of 122,644 copies in 2003.

Its circulation was 94,461 copies in 2008 and 62,614 copies in 2009. The circulation of the weekly was 54,046 copies in 2011.

See also
 List of magazines in Spain

References

External links
 

1976 establishments in Spain
2018 disestablishments in Spain
Defunct magazines published in Spain
Magazines established in 1976
Magazines disestablished in 2018
Magazines published in Madrid
News magazines published in Spain
Spanish-language magazines
Weekly magazines published in Spain